Coenradt Thomas Houghtaling (1763 – March 18, 1836) was an American politician.

Early life
Houghtaling was born in New Baltimore, New York in 1763. He was a son of Capt. Thomas Houghtaling (1731–1824) and Elizabeth (née Whitbeck) Houghtaling. Among his siblings were brothers Hendrick Houghtaling (who married Elizabeth Staats), Andries "Andrew" Houghtaling  (who married Polly N. Van Benthuysen) and sister, Hester Houghtaling, was the wife of Peter A. Van Bergen (the brother of his wife). His father fought in the second Battle of Saratoga under Lt.-Col. DuBois and Col. Anthony Van Bergen, who led the 11th Regiment of the Albany County militia in the Revolutionary War.

His paternal grandparents were Hendrick Houghtaling and Hester (née Bricker) Houghtaling. He was a descendant of Mathys Houghtaling, the original Houghtaling Patent holder.

Career
In April 1807, Houghtaling was elected to represent Greene County in the New York State Assembly for the 31st New York State Legislature, serving from July 1, 1807 to June 30, 1808.

Personal life
Houghtaling was married to Catharina "Catharine" Van Bergen (b. 1767), the sister of his wife's husband Peter, and a daughter of Col. Anthony Van Bergen and Maria (née Salisbury) Van Bergen. Through her grandmother, Christina (née Coster) Van Bergen, she was a descendant of Albany Mayor Dirck Wesselse Ten Broeck. Together, they were the parents of:

 Abraham Coenradt Houghtaling (1798–1841), who married Charlotte Bronk (1799–1891); their daughter Mary (b. 1831) was the wife of Martin Geritsen Van Slyke (b. 1829).

Houghtaling died on March 18, 1836.

References

1763 births
1836 deaths
Members of the New York State Assembly